Vijayawada Gudur Intercity Express (Train No: 12743/12744) is a daily Superfast train that runs between Vijayawada Junction and Gudur Junction in Andhra Pradesh. This train belongs to Vijayawada Division of South Central Railway Zone.

History 
This train service was introduced in 2019, mainly for the convenience of localities of Nellore, Ongole to visit state's Capital region of Andhra Pradesh. The Gudur Vijaywada Intercity Express was flagged off to a start on 1 September 2019 by Vice-President M Venkaiah Naidu, Union Minister of State for Railways Suresh Angadi and other South Central Railway officials.

Route and Halts

Traction 
It is hauled by a Vijayawada-based WAP-7 locomotive.

See also 
 Pinakini Express
 Satavahana Express
 Ratnachal Express
 Vijayawada-Lingampalli Intercity Express

References 

Express trains in India
Vijayawada railway division